The Yulongsi Formation is a palaeontological geological formation located at Qujing, in Yunnan Province of Southern China.

Geology
The formation is of the Pridoli epoch of the Late Silurian period, during the Paleozoic Era.

See also 
 
 
 List of fossil sites — (with link directory)

References

Geologic formations of China
Silurian System of Asia
Silurian China
Silurian paleontological sites
Paleontology in Yunnan